Zachary Hamner Taylor   was an American first baseman in the National Association for the 1874 Baltimore Canaries. Previously he was the captain of the amateur "Peabody Baseball Club" for a decade.

References

External links

Major League Baseball first basemen
19th-century baseball players
Baltimore Canaries players
1850 births
1917 deaths